{{DISPLAYTITLE:C6H4O5}}
The molecular formula C6H4O5 may refer to:
2,5-Furandicarboxylic acid
2,4-Furandicarboxylic acid
3,4-Furandicarboxylic acid
Trihydroxybenzoquinone
2,3,5-Trihydroxy-1,4-benzoquinone 
3,4,5-Trihydroxy-1,2-benzoquinone 
3,4,6-Trihydroxy-1,2-benzoquinone

See also 
 Hydroxybenzoquinone